Rosalind I. J. Hackett is a British-born American historian, formerly a Distinguished Humanities Professor at the University of Tennessee from 2003 to 2008. She was born and spent her early life in England.

References

External links 
 Rosalind I. J. Hackett, Department of Religious Studies, The University of Tennessee, Knoxville
 

Year of birth missing (living people)
Living people
University of Tennessee faculty
21st-century American historians